The Commander of the Armed Forces is the professional head of the National Army, the military of the Republic of Suriname. The position dates back to the country's independence from the Netherlands in 1975, with the military being named the Surinamese Armed Forces until after the Sergeants' Coup in 1980.

The Commander of the Armed Forces is appointed by the President of Suriname, who is the commander-in-chief according to the Constitution.

The current Commander of the Armed Forces is Colonel Werner Kioe A Sen, serving since 27 October 2022.

List of commanders of the armed forces

Notes

See also 
 Suriname National Army

References 

Commander of the Armed Forces
Suriname
Commander of the Armed Forces